Băteşti may refer to several villages in Romania:

 Băteşti, a village in Brazi Commune, Prahova County
 Băteşti, a village administered by Făget town, Timiș County